Gregory Luke Wood (born 2 December 1988 in Dewsbury, West Yorkshire, England) is an English cricketer, who played for England in the 2006 U-19 Cricket World Cup in Sri Lanka.  He played one List A match for Yorkshire County Cricket Club in 2007, before leaving the club prior to start of the 2009 season.

He is a left-handed batsman and wicket-keeper who impressed for England U-19s and Yorkshire Second XI.  He won the Denis Compton award in 2005.  Progressing through league cricket and the Yorkshire Academy, he was an integral part of the Yorkshire U-17 side, that beat Surrey in the final of the 2005 ECB U-17 version of the County Championship.

External links
 

1988 births
Living people
English cricketers
People educated at Queen Elizabeth Grammar School, Wakefield
Yorkshire cricketers
Cricketers from Dewsbury
English cricketers of the 21st century